Group Health Cooperative, (formerly known as Group Health Cooperative of Puget Sound), later more commonly known as Group Health, was an American nonprofit healthcare organization based in Seattle, Washington.

Business model

Corporate structure
Despite being marketed as a cooperative for much of the organization's history, Group Health never legally presented itself as a cooperative.  It was a nonprofit organization with members.  Members were always able to amend bylaws and elect a board of trustees, but never owned organization assets or directly controlled operations.

Group Health Community Foundation (GHCF) was funded with the acquisition of Group Health by Kaiser Permaente in 2017 with approximately $1.8 billion in assets. Founded in 1983, the new GHCF is entirely independent of Kaiser Permanente. GHCF may continue to invest in efforts to improve health and health care through immunizations, innovation, and patient care.

History

Group Health was officially registered as a corporation in Washington on December 22, 1945. Group Health's founders included Thomas G. Bevan, then president of lodge 751 of the International Association of Machinists and Aerospace Workers at Boeing; Ella Willams, a leader in a local chapter of The National Grange of the Order of Patrons of Husbandry; Addison Shoudy, R.M Mitchell, and Stanley Erickson, who were pioneers in the American cooperative movement; and other community members who had no strong past affiliation with any particular social group.

Originally named Group Health Cooperative of Puget Sound, the "of Puget Sound" was dropped in 1995.

The Seattle Times noted in 2012 that non-profit insurance companies, including Premera Blue Cross, Regence BlueShield, and Group Health, were stockpiling billions of dollars in reserves while increasing their rates at the same time.

On December 4, 2015, it was announced that Group Health would be acquired by Kaiser Permanente. In January 2017 Washington State regulators endorsed the acquisition of Group Health by Kaiser Permanente. The acquisition resulted in a newly formed not-for-profit 501(c)(4) under the name Group Health Community Foundation (GHCF).

Group Health Research Institute
Group Health's research leg was the Group Health Research Institute (GHRI), formerly known as Group Health Center for Health Studies. Now known as Kaiser Permanente Washington Health Research Institute (KPWHRI), it works with institutions such as the University of Washington and the National Institutes of Health. It is a member of the Health Care Systems Research Network (HCSRN), formerly known as the HMO Research Network.

Group Health Cooperative Medical Library
Group Health Cooperative Medical Library was founded in 1969. As of 2011 it subscribed to 8,000 electronic journals and had 400 books.  It specializes in allied health professions, medicine, health maintenance organizations, health administration, nursing, and pharmacy.

Notable staff
Scott Armstrong became president and CEO of Group Health in 2003. He is a commissioner of the Medicare Payment Advisory Commission, board chair of the Alliance of Community Health Plans, a board member of America's Health Insurance Plans and the Pacific Science Center, a member of the Community Development Roundtable in Seattle, and a fellow of the American College of Healthcare Executives. He was named among the top 40 of the "100 Most Powerful People in Healthcare" in 2010 by Modern Healthcare magazine.

See also
Kaiser Permanente

References

Bibliography
 Walt Crowley, To Serve the Greatest Number, University of Washington Press, 1996.  The most thorough history published.
 Walt Crowley and HistoryLink, Group Health Timeline, HistoryLink, 2007.  An update and summary of To Serve the Greatest Number.

External links

 

Companies based in Seattle
Cooperatives in the United States
Medical and health organizations based in Washington (state)
Healthcare in Idaho
Healthcare in Washington (state)
Libraries in Seattle